The Nicky Rackard Cup (often referred to as the Rackard Cup) is the fourth tier of the All-Ireland Senior Hurling Championship. Each year, the champion team in the Nicky Rackard Cup is promoted to the Christy Ring Cup, and the lowest finishing team is relegated to the Lory Meagher Cup.

The Nicky Rackard Cup, which was introduced for the 2005 season, is a recent initiative in providing a meaningful championship for third tier teams deemed "too weak" for any higher grades.

The winners of the championship receive the Nicky Rackard Cup, named after former Wexford hurler Nicky Rackard regarded as one of the greatest hurlers of all time.

In the 2022 season, Tyrone were the Nicky Rackard Cup champions.

History and format

Inauguration of the competition

In 2003 the Hurling Development Committee (HDC) was charged with restructuring the entire hurling championship. The committee was composed of chairman Pat Dunny (Kildare), Liam Griffin (Wexford), P. J. O'Grady (Limerick), Ger Loughnane (Clare), Cyril Farrell (Galway), Jimmy O'Reilly (Down), Willie Ring (Cork), Pat Daly (GAA Games Development Officer) and Nicky English (Tipperary). Over the course of three months they held discussions with managers, players and officials, while also taking a submission from the Gaelic Players Association. The basic tenet of the proposals was to structure the hurling championship into three tiers in accordance with 2004 National Hurling League status.

The top tier was confined to 12 teams, while the next twenty teams would contest the second and third tiers which were to be known respectively as the Christy Ring Cup and Nicky Rackard Cup. There would also be promotion-relegation play-offs between the three championship tiers. The HDC also suggested that these games would be played as curtain raisers to All-Ireland quarter-finals and semi-finals.

The proposal were accepted at the 2005 GAA Congress. The Christy Ring Cup and the Nicky Rackard Cup competitions were launched at Croke Park on 8 December 2004.

2005-2006
The twelve participating teams were divided into three groups of four and played in a round-robin format. Each team was guaranteed at least three games each. The three group winners qualified for the knock-out semi-finals of the competition. The runners-up in groups 3B and 3C contested a play-off with the winner playing the runner up in group 3A in a lone quarter-final. The winner of that match joined the three group winners in the semi-finals.

2007-2008

The twelve participating teams were divided into four groups of three and played in a round-robin format, thus limiting each team to just two games each. The eventual group winners and runners-up qualified for the knock-out quarter-finals of the competition.

2009-2017

In 2009 a double elimination format was introduced, thus guaranteeing each team at least two games before being eliminated from the competition.
The eight teams play four Round 1 matches.
The winners in Round 1 advance to Round 2A.
The losers in Round 1 go into Round 2B.
There are two Round 2A matches.
The winners in Round 2A advance to the semi-finals.
The losers in Round 2A go into the quarter-finals.
There are two Round 2B matches.
The winners in Round 2B advance to the quarter-finals.
The losers in Round 2B go into the relegation playoff.
The losers of the relegation playoff are relegated to the Lory Meagher Cup for the following year.
There are two quarter-final matches between the Round 2A losers and Round 2B winners.
The winners of the quarter-finals advance to the semi-finals.
The losers of the quarter-finals are eliminated.
There are two semi-final matches between the Round 2A winners and the quarter-final winners.
The winners of the semi-finals advance to the final.
The losers of the semi-finals are eliminated.
The winners of the final win the Nicky Rackard Cup and are promoted to the Christy Ring Cup for the following year.

2018-present

Beginning in 2018, the Nicky Rackard Cup changed format, with initial ties played in group stages, which in 2018 consisted of one of four teams and one of three. Previously it was a double elimination tournament. The top two teams from both groups advance to the cup semi-finals. The bottom team from each group will progress to a relegation final.

The winner of the Nicky Rackard Cup will be promoted to the Christy Ring Cup, For 2018 only, 2 teams will be relegated from the 2018 Christy Ring Cup to the 2019 Nicky Rackard Cup to bring the number of teams in the 2019 edition to an even 8, allowing for two groups of 4.

The loser of the relegation final will be relegated to the Lory Meagher Cup, to be replaced by the winner of the previous years competition.

List of finals

Team records and statistics

Wins by province

Player records

Top scorers per championship

Top scorers: final

References

 
All-Ireland inter-county hurling championships
Hurling cup competitions